Pseudischnocampa humosa is a moth of the family Erebidae. It was described by Paul Dognin in 1893. It is found in Ecuador.

References

Phaegopterina
Moths described in 1893